Devang Patel (born 1970) is an Indian singer, actor, rapper, songwriter, dancer, film producer, film director and music performer.

Career
Muratiyo No. 1 (2005) and Vanechandno Varghodo (2007), both starring Devang Patel, were big budget Gujarati films but had moderate success commercially.

Devang Patel along with Singer Shuchita Vyas have dedicated a beautiful song to the walled city Ahmedabad, entitled as Amdavad Heritage Garbo.walled city has been declared as India's first World Heritage City,. The Video Song features Devang Patel driving a Mercedes while Shuchita can be seen performing Garba at heritage sites. They are singing praises of all the stunning places to visit in Ahmedabad, from mountains to bridges, from temples to markets. They are seen inviting people to come and visit the beautiful city and experience its beauty by visiting all the places of World Heritage City Ahmedabad.

Discography
Patel is known for his parodied songs in early 2000. Prior that, Patel also sang some songs for Bollywood and Gujarati films.

Buma Bum ( Gujrati parody songs )

Aa Aaa Eee Ooo
Aa Dudh Thodi Shakkar
Bagdi Gaya Dada
Chashmish Mane Log Bole
Jaldi Jaldi Shodhine Aapjo
Mari Marjhi
Maru Shirt Fateli Mari Pent Fateli
Murkho Mane Kehta
Raate Chadar Odhine
Roj Chare Baju Chovis Kalak
Tari Budhi Nathi Sathe

Meri Marzi (1995)

"Meri Marzi" parody of It's My Life by Dr. Alban
"Ghar Kiyon Aaya Kayar"
"Machi Booma Boom"
"Flop Ten"

Patel Scope (2000) Times Music

"Aye Raju" parody of Alane by Wes Madiko
"Ladoo Kha" parody of Coco Jamboo by Mr. President
"Hathi Pajee" parody of Tic, Tic Tac by Chilli ft. Carrapicho
"Ghoom Ghoom" parody of Boom, Boom, Boom, Boom!! by Vengaboys
"Mauj hi Mauj"
"Kanwara Bechara"
"Bhai mere Bhai" parody of Chal Mere Bhai from Chal Mere Bhai
"Thoka" parody of Livin' la Vida Loca by Ricky Martin
"Hat ke Rehna" parody of Macarena
"Papa Ke Papa" parody of We Like to Party by Vengaboys
"Karna Nai" parody of Cotton-Eyed Joe by Dorothy Scarborough
"Mufat Mein Jo Mile" parody of The Cup of Life by Ricky Martin

Patel Scope II
"Bloody Fool"- Parody of "Daddy Cool" by Boney M.
"Aye Mere Seth"- Parody of "Ek Pal Ka Jeena" from Kaho Naa... Pyaar Hai
"Taal Pe Baal"- Parody of "Taal Se Taal" from Taal
"Chasma Chasma"- Parody of "Hamma" from Bombay
"Kuttha Kaata"- Parody of "Who Let the Dogs Out?" by Baha Men
"Don't Mind"- Parody of "Şımarık" by Tarkan and Kiss Kiss by Holly Valance
"Apun Bola"- Parody of the homonymous song from Josh
"Oh Oh Jaane Jaana"- Parody of the homonymous song from Pyar Kiya To Darna Kya
"Kya Bolti Tu"- Parody of the homonymous song from Ghulam
"Dus"- Parody of "They Don't Care About Us" by Michael Jackson
"Sehan Karna Nahi"- Parody of "Desert Rose" from Sting
"Ki Dhulai"- Parody "Stayin' Alive" from Bee Gees
"Chaddi"- Parody of "Yaad Piya Ki" by Falguni Pathak
"Made in India"- Parody of "Made in India" by Alisha Chinai
"Thu"- Parody of "Tu Hi Tu" by Sonu Nigam
"Bhaiya Bhaiya"- Parody of "Chaiyya Chaiyya" from Dil Se..
"Soch Le Bhai"- Parody of "Dil Le Gayee Kudi Gujarat Di" by Jasbir Jassi
"Ara Ra Ra"- Parody of "Bolo Tara Ra Ra" by Daler Mehandi

Patel Scope III
"Somwar Ko Sita" Parody of Ina Meena Dika by Kishore Kumar
"Main Adha Raha" Parody of Tu Tu Hai Wohi from Ek Haseena Thi, the starting music is based on the techno song Around the World (La La La La La)
"Hai Kamar Hoi Kamar" Parody of Whenever, Wherever by Shakira
"TV serial Jab Banta Hai" parody of Thoda Resham Lagta Hai by Meghna Naidu
"Bhajiya Garam" parody of Dum Maro Dum from Hare Rama Hare Krishna"Susu-Susu" parody of Suku Suku by Shammi Kapoor"Cat Mouse Dog" parody of Jailhouse Rock by Elvis Presley"Chalte Chalte" parody of Chalte Chalte from Pakeezah"Dil Chahta Hai" parody of Dil Chahta Hai from Dil Chahta Hai"Monkey Monkey" parody of Money, Money, Money by ABBA"De De Thappad De" parody of Hey Baby from No Doubt"Main Hoon Mad" Parody of Bad by Michael Jackson"Ho Jata Hai Scene" Parody of Rasputin by Boney M."Kambhakt Machhar" Parody of Kambakht Ishq from Pyaar Tune Kya Kiya"Aish tu kar"
Grand Hali movie was released in 2017 where he worked as actor, director, music director, writer, singer, co producer.
YOGANAA a single for Yoga.
His latest single Bewafa tari Jafa is a huge current hit.
Garba Albums:
Sathvaaro
Sath Sangath
Saaheli
Ghume Eno Garbo

Films

As actor
 Grand Hali (2017)
 Smile Please (2004)
 Muratiyo No. 1 (Gujarati, 2005)
 Vanechandno Varghodo (Gujarati, 2007)
 Swaminarayan Serial as a Dada Khaachar (By Kalupur Swaminarayan Mandir)

Singer
 Grand Hali (2017)
 Smile Please (2004)
 Chaahat (1996)
 Gambler (1995)
 Mard'' (1998)

References

External links
 
 
 

Living people
Indian male film actors
Hindi film producers
1970 births
Male actors from Gujarat
Singers from Gujarat
Indian rappers